The Acacia Strain is an American metalcore band originally from Chicopee, Massachusetts. They are currently signed to Rise Records. The band has released ten full-length albums.

History 

Forming in 2001, The Acacia Strain was started by high school friends Vincent Bennett, Christopher Daniele, and Ben Abert. Looking to bring their current band Septic Orgasm to the next level of technicality, they brought in their mutual friend, Karrie Whitfield, and high school student Daniel "DL" Laskiewicz to play bass and guitar respectively. The band began playing local shows around Massachusetts and recorded their demo in 2001.

After DL received a shoulder injury while playing high school football, Bennett asked friend and current Blood Has Been Shed guitarist, Daniel Daponde, to fill in on guitar while DL healed from his injury. The group felt Daponde brought a heavier and more technical aspect to the band, so when DL returned they wanted Daponde to stay, thus forming the unusual three guitar lineup.

After countless local shows, including quite a few in Bennett mother's basement, the band was approached by Toby Dutkiewicz, who ran Devil's Head records, if they would join his label. The band agreed and recording for their debut album ...And Life Is Very Long  began in 2002 at Zing recording studio in Westfield, Massachusetts with Adam Dutkiewicz and Jim Fogarty at the helm with Jim doing most of the tracking.

Artistry

Musical style 
The Acacia Strain's music has been primarily described as deathcore and metalcore, and has been noted to include heavy influences from sludge, doom metal and death metal along with some punk rock-style aesthetic and sensibilities.

AllMusic characterizes the band's musical style as "utiliz[ing] a bone-crushing rhythm section, apocalyptic samples, and a unique triple-guitar assault to deliver their signature blend of hardcore punk, noise, death metal and doom metal." The site's review of Wormwood elaborates on the band's sound as "an inelegant and unstoppable juggernaut fueled by memories of the unchecked aggression unleashed on the world by the likes of Sepultura and Pantera."

Vocalist Vincent Bennett and drummer Kevin Boutot have both denied that The Acacia Strain is of the "deathcore genre", going as far as expressing dislike for the label, though Bennett was later more ambivalent towards it, stating "sometimes I get it, sometimes I don't."

The Acacia Strain's influences include Candiria, Integrity, Dismember, Deftones, Rush, Iron Maiden, Crowbar, Meshuggah, Hatebreed, Slayer, Arch Enemy, and Overcast.

Lyrics 

Written by lead vocalist Vincent Bennett, the band's lyrics generally center around misanthropy and nihilism. Bennett employs misogynistic and sexually deviant imagery in his lyrics, but usually only as metaphors to help get his points across while keeping the songs' overall meanings open for interpretation.

Members 

Current
 Vincent Bennett – lead vocals (2001–present)
 Kevin Boutot – drums (2005–present)
 Devin Shidaker – lead guitar, backing vocals (2013–present)
 Griffin Landa – bass (2015–present)
 Mike Mulholland – rhythm guitar (2022–present)

Former
 Daniel "DL" Laskiewicz – guitar, programming (2001–2013); rhythm guitar (2007–2013)
 Daniel Daponde – guitar, backing vocals  (2001–2006)
 Christopher Daniele – third guitar (2001–2005)
 Ben Abert – drums (2001–2004, 2004–2005)
 Karrie Whitfield – bass (2001–2003)
 Jeanne Sagan – bass (2003)
 Seth Coleman – bass (2004–2006)
 Jack Strong – bass (2006–2015)
 Richard Gomez – rhythm guitar (2013–2016)
 Tom Smith – rhythm guitar  (2016–2022) 

Touring musicians
 Mark Castillo – drums (2004)
 John Preston – bass (2003)
 David Sroka – rhythm guitar (2009)
 Mike Casavant – rhythm guitar (2009–2010)
 Tim Cavallari – lead guitar (2010–2012)
 Tony Diaz – rhythm guitar (2010–2012)
 Matt Guglielmo – drums (2018)

Timeline

Discography

Studio albums

EPs
Money for Nothing (2013)
Above/Below (2013)
The Depression Sessions with Thy Art Is Murder and Fit for an Autopsy (2016)

Singles
"Jonestown" (2010)
"Servant in the Place of Truth" (2012)
"Above – Below" (2013)
"D" (2020)
"E" (2020)
"C" (2020)
"A" (2020)
"Y" (2020)

Demos
2001 Demo (2001)

DVDs
The Most Known Unknown (2010)

Music videos 
"Smoke Ya Later" (2004)
"3750" (2005)
"Angry Mob Justice" (2006)
"Skynet" (2009)
"The Hills Have Eyes" (2010)
"The Impaler" (2011)
"Cauterizer" (2014)
"Send Help" (2015)
"One Thousand Painful Stings" (2020)

References

External links 

2001 establishments in Massachusetts
Metalcore musical groups from Massachusetts
American deathcore musical groups
Musical groups established in 2001
Musical groups from Springfield, Massachusetts
Musical quintets
Rise Records artists